American R&B singer Monica has released 8 studio albums, one extended play, and 35 singles (including six as a featured artist). Since the beginning of her career in 1995, she has sold 5.3 million albums in the United States, In 1999, Billboard included her among the top twenty of the Top Pop Artists of the 1990s, and in 2010, the magazine ranked her 24th on its list of the Top 50 R&B and Hip Hop Artists of the past 25 years. With a career lasting over 20 years, Monica became the first artist to top the US Billboard Hot R&B/Hip-Hop Songs chart in the 1990s, 2000s, and 2010s.

Monica's debut studio album, titled Miss Thang was released in July 1995, selling about 1.5 million million copies in the United States.  It produced three top ten singles, including debut single "Don't Take It Personal (Just One of Dem Days)" and follow-up "Before You Walk Out of My Life", both of which made her the youngest artist ever to have two consecutive chart-topping hits on the Billboard Hot R&B Singles chart. In 1997, Monica released the top five single "For You I Will", which originated from the sports comedy film Space Jam and its soundtrack and became another platinum seller. Her second album The Boy Is Mine was released in 1998 and earned her major international chart success. It peaked at number eight on the Billboard 200 and was certified three-times platinum in the United States and Canada. Pushed by its same-titled number-one hit, a massive commercial success duet with fellow R&B teen singer Brandy, it spawned five commercially released singles, including further chart-topper "The First Night" and "Angel of Mine".

After a label switch to J Records, Monica released After the Storm in 2003, a retooled version of her third album, All Eyez on Me (2002), which had received a Japan-wide release only after its first single's commercial failure and an early leak via the internet. The album became the singer's first album to debut at number-one on the Billboard 200 chart and eventually sold more than a million copies stateside, with its single "So Gone" becoming Monica's biggest-selling singles in years. Her fifth studio album, The Makings of Me, released in 2006, was considered a commercial failure and was left uncertified by the Recording Industry Association of America (RIAA).

In 2009, Monica's duet with singer Keyshia Cole, "Trust", reached the top five of Billboards Hot R&B/Hip-Hop Songs chart. The recording of her sixth studio album Still Standing (2010) was chronicled by her BET reality series of the same name. It spawned her biggest-charting single in seven years, "Everything to Me", her sixth number-one hit on the Hot R&B/Hip-Hop Songs chart. Still Standing was eventually certified gold by the RIAA, with domestic shipments of 500,000 copies, and also produced the R&B top ten hit  "Love All Over Me". In 2012, Monica's seventh album New Life was released to moderate sales. Its four singles, including lead single "It All Belongs to Me", another duet with Brandy, failed to achieve any Billboard Hot 100 entry. In 2015, her eighth studio album Code Red was released.

Albums

Studio albums

Compilations
 Super Hits (2008) (Sony BMG Music Entertainment – A 721551)

Mixtapes
 Monica: Made Mixtape (2007)

Extended plays
 Dance Vault Remixes: Get It Off/Knock Knock (2004)

Singles

As lead artist

As featured artist

Promotional singles

Other appearances

Guests

Soundtracks

DVDs

See also
 List of songs recorded by Monica
 Monica videography

Notes

References
General

 
 
 

Specific

External links
 Monica official website
 

Rhythm and blues discographies
Discographies of American artists